José Luis Sánchez del Río (March 28, 1913 – February 10, 1928) was a Mexican Cristero who was put to death by government officials because he refused to renounce his Catholic faith. His death was seen as a largely political venture on the part of government officials in their attempt to stamp out dissent and crush religious freedom in the area. He was dubbed "Joselito."

He was declared to be venerable on June 22, 2004, by Pope John Paul II and was beatified by Pope Benedict XVI – through the Cardinal-Prefect of the Congregation of the Causes of Saints – on November 20, 2005, in Mexico. Pope Francis approved a miracle attributed to him on January 21, 2016, allowing for his canonization to take place; a date was determined at a consistory on March 15, 2016, and he was proclaimed to be a saint on October 16, 2016.

Background
The Cristero War began when the government began eliminating church privileges and seizing church properties throughout the country, in accordance with anti-clerical laws written into the Mexican Constitution. President Plutarco Elias Calles, who took office in 1924, focused on the Roman Catholic Church, which led to seizure of church property, the closing of religious schools and convents, and the exile or the execution of priests.

Life and Cristero War
José Luis Sánchez del Río was born on March 28, 1913, in Sahuayo, Michoacán. He attended school first in his hometown, then in Guadalajara in Jalisco.

When the Cristero War broke out in 1926, his brothers joined the rebel forces, but his mother would not allow him to take part. The rebel general, Prudencio Mendoza Alcazar, also refused his enlistment. The boy insisted that he wanted the chance to give his life for Jesus Christ and so come to Heaven easily. Mendoza relented and allowed José to become the flagbearer of the troop. The Cristeros nicknamed him Tarcisius, after the early Christian saint who was martyred for protecting the Eucharist from desecration.

During heavy fighting on January 25, 1928, a soldier named Mendoza had his horse killed and José gave his horse to the man so that he could flee. Then he sought cover and fired at the enemy until he ran out of ammunition. The government troops captured the boy and imprisoned him.

Torture and death
It was later reported that José was captured by government forces, who ordered him to renounce his faith in Christ, under threat of death. He refused to accept apostasy.

To break his resolve, he was made to watch the hanging of another Cristero that they had in custody, but instead José encouraged the man, saying that they would soon meet again in Heaven after death. In prison, José prayed the Rosary daily and wrote an emotional letter to his mother, saying that he was ready to fulfill the will of God to whom he dedicated himself. His father attempted to raise a ransom to save him, but was not able to appease the government in time to do so, thus failing to secure the release of his son.

Others recalled the gruesome events that transpired after the government's failure to break José's resolve on the evening of February 10, 1928: "Consequently they cut the bottom of his feet and obliged him to walk around the town toward the cemetery. They also at times cut him with a machete until he was bleeding from several wounds. He cried and moaned with pain, but he did not give in. At times they stopped him and said, 'If you shout, "Death to Christ the King" we will spare your life'. José would only shout, 'I will never give in. Viva Cristo Rey!'"

Burial and relics
The remains of José Luis Sánchez del Río are enshrined above a side altar in the Church of Saint James the Apostle in Sahuayo, his hometown.

Sainthood

The sainthood proceedings opened in Zamora on May 1, 1996 in a diocesan process that continued until October 25, 1996. A week prior to the conclusion of that phase the Congregation for the Causes of Saints declared "nihil obstat" (nothing against) to the cause on October 21, 1996; this granted him the title Servant of God, the first stage in the sainthood process. The process was later ratified on November 29, 2002, and allowed for officials to draft and submit in 2003 the Positio on his martyrdom.

Pope John Paul II approved the findings on June 22, 2004, thus allowing his beatification. He was beatified by Pope Benedict XVI on November 20, 2005, in Mexico; the Cardinal-Prefect of the Congregation for the Causes of Saints presided on behalf of the pontiff.

The miracle needed for his canonization attributed to José Luis Sánchez del Río the inexplicable recovery of a baby in Mexico who doctors said had "no hope of survival", 2008–2009. It was investigated on a local level in Mexico and concluded its work on January 30, 2015. A medical board approved it in 2015 while theologians did so as well on October 8, 2015; the C.C.S. granted final approval on January 12, 2016, before submitting it to the pope for his approval.

Pope Francis approved the miracle as being directly attributed to his intercession on January 21, 2016, and the pope confirmed at an ordinary consistory of cardinals on March 15, 2016, the date of which he would be elevated to sainthood. He was canonized as a saint of the Roman Catholic Church on October 16, 2016.

Legacy
The "Blessed José Sánchez del Río High School Seminary" was established in 2008 in Mankato, Minnesota by Father Carlos Miguel Buela of the Institute of the Incarnate Word (IVE), a Roman Catholic religious institute. The junior (middle) high school and high school is a preparatory seminary quartered on the 1854 parish grounds of the Saints Peter and Paul Catholic Church in Mankato, Minnesota. The school's teen and young adult students are known collectively as "The Minor Seminarians".

The newly named "St. José Sánchez del Río Catholic School" is located in San Antonio, Texas.  Under the auspice of the Archdiocese of San Antonio, Archbishop Gustavo Garcia-Siller renamed the school prior to the start of the 2019–2020 school year.  The school's mascot are the "Defenders of the Faith" in line with the charism of San Joselito and uses the rosary, Virgen de Guadalupe, and a palm as symbols of his devotion and faith.

In popular culture
José Luis Sánchez del Río is one of the characters portrayed in the film For Greater Glory which depicts the story of the Cristero War and also depicts his martyrdom.

See also

Saints of the Cristero War

References

Further reading
 Ferreira, Cornelia R. Saint José Luis Sánchez del Rio: Cristero Boy Martyr, 2d. ed., biography (2017 Canisius Books).
 McKenzie, Kevin William “Saint José, Boy Cristero Martyr", biography (2019)

External links
 Hagiography Circle
 Saints SQPN
 Biography at Vatican News Service
 Blessed José Sánchez del Rio High School Seminary

1913 births
1928 deaths
20th-century executions by Mexico
20th-century Roman Catholic martyrs
20th-century venerated Christians
Mexican Roman Catholic saints
Roman Catholic child saints
Cristero War
Executed children
Executed Mexican people
Mexican children
People executed by Mexico by firearm
People from Sahuayo
Beatifications by Pope Benedict XVI
Canonizations by Pope Francis